Avengers Grimm: Time Wars is a 2018 American superhero mockbuster film written, co-edited, and directed by Jeremy M. Inman. The film, produced by film company The Asylum, stars Erik Feltes, Lauren Parkinson, and Marah Fairclough.

The film is a mockbuster of the Marvel Studios superhero film Avengers: Infinity War and the ABC TV series Once Upon a Time.  It is a sequel to 2015's Avengers Grimm.

Plot
Years have passed since the first film, with the shattering of the magic mirror portal spreading shards of the mirror across the world. To combat threats from the fairytale realm, an organization called Looking Glass was founded; led by Alice (whose sanity is maintained by medicine Hatter makes for her), the princesses and Red work to locate the fragments to rebuild the portal to go home. However, the power-crazed ruler of Atlantis, Magda the Mad, is threatening the world in her hunt for Prince Charming (who survived Rumplestiltskin's attempt on his life) to force him to marry her so she can get his ring, which will literally allow her to rule all the land. A different Rumplestiltskin allies with Magda in exchange for Atlantis. Snow White is revived to combat the threat.

Cast
 Eric Feltes as Rumpelstiltskin
 Lauren Parkinson as Snow White
 Marah Fairclough as Sleeping Beauty
 Elizabeth Eileen as Red
 Christina Licciardi as Alice
 Michael Marcel as Prince Charles Charming III
 Katherine Maya as Magda
 Randall Yarbrough as Hatter
 William Knight as Larry
 Rah Johnson as Merman Captain
 Brian Let as Merman
 Ivan Djurovic as Merman
 Ryan Patrick Shanahan as Merman
 Shamar Philippe as Merman
 Jason Ainley as Baby Dick

Release
Avengers Grimm: Time Wars was released direct-to-DVD on May 1, 2018, in the United States.

References

External links
 Official site at The Asylum
 

2018 films
2010s English-language films
2018 action films
2010s superhero films
American fantasy action films
American independent films
American superhero films
Mockbuster films
Films based on fairy tales
Films set in Los Angeles
Films shot in Los Angeles
The Asylum films
Cultural depictions of the Brothers Grimm
2010s American films